Jakub Polaczyk, (born 1983 in Krakow) is a Polish composer and pianist based in New York City. Winner of the American Prize in Composition 2020 and Iron Composer 2013. Graduated from the Academy of Music in Kraków, Jagiellonian University and Carnegie Mellon University. He studied in Poland with: Marcel Chyrzyński, Krzysztof Penderecki, Marek Chołoniewski (pl), in Belgium with Jan Van Landeghem and in the USA with Reza Vali. Currently teaching at The New York Conservatory of Music.  Since 2018 Polaczyk has been the New Music Director of the International Chopin & Friends Festival in NYC.

References

External links 

 
Jakub Polaczyk on YouTube

21st-century Polish pianists
1983 births
Living people
Musicians from Kraków